The social construction of gender is a theory in feminism and sociology about the manifestation of cultural origins, mechanisms, and corollaries of gender perception and expression in the context of interpersonal and group social interaction. Specifically, the social construction of gender stipulates that gender roles are an achieved "status" in a social environment, which implicitly and explicitly categorize people and therefore motivate social behaviors.

A related matter in feminist theory is the relationship between the ascribed status of assigned sex (male or female) and their achieved status counterparts in gender (masculine and feminine).

Basic concepts

World Health Organization
The World Health Organization (WHO) stated in 2023 that

Status and hierarchy
The WHO states in 2023 that

In the context of feminist theory, the word status deviates from its colloquial usage meaning rank or prestige but instead refers to a series of strata or categories by which societies are divided, in some ways synonymous with "labels" or "roles". The semantic distinctions of "labels" and "roles" are homogenized into the term "status" and then re-differentiated by the division into "ascribed status" and "achieved status" respectively.

Within the domain of psychoanalytical and Radical feminism, status bears additional significance as a mechanism of arbitrary power; where arbitrary refers to the derivation of power from status as opposed to mutual agreement of involved parties. Therefore, the undermining and disassembly of status and status symbols is a prerequisite to liberation from arbitrary power.

Social constructionism

Social constructionism is a theory of knowledge which describes the relationship between the objectivity of reality and the capacity of human senses and cognition. Specifically it asserts that reality exists as the summation of social perceptions and expression; and that the reality which is perceived is the only reality worth consideration. This is accompanied by the corollaries that any perceived reality is valid, that reality is subject to manipulation via control over social perceptions and expressions.

The social constructionist movement emerged in relation to both criticism and rejection of Objectivism developed by Russian-American writer Ayn Rand. Specifically, in the assumption of a positivist basis for knowledge; which is to say that social constructionism rejects the notion that empirical facts can be known about reality, where as objectivism is defined by it. Though not explicitly reliant on it, much literature on the subject of social constructionism focuses on its relationship in many facets to hierarchy and power. This intimacy demonstrates the close inspirational source of Marxist doctrine, as utilized in the works of Foucault and his writings on discourse.

The work The Blank Slate of Harvard psychologist Steven Pinker, demonstrates the existence of socially constructed categories such as "money, tenure, citizenship, decorations for bravery, and the presidency of the United States." which "exist only because people tacitly agree to act as if they exist." However they are not in support of social constructionism as the sole means of understanding reality, rather as a specific context for specific phenomena, and support the consideration of empirical scientific data in our understanding of the nature of human existence. In this manner, Pinker explicitly contradicts social constructionist scholars Marecek, Crawford & Popp in "On the Construction of Gender, Sex, and Sexualities", who argue against the idea that socially organized patterns can emerge from isolated origins and favor instead the theory of Tabula rasa, which states that knowledge and meaning are generated exclusively as a collective effort and that the individual is incapable of doing so independently. In essence, the creation of meaning is a shared effort even when achieved by an individual in solitary conditions, because individuality is an illusion found at the intersection of myriad external influences being filtered through Id, Ego, and Super-ego.

Alsop, Fitzsimmons & Lennon also note that the constructionist accounts of gender creation can be divided into two main streams:
 Materialist theories, which underline the structural aspects of the social environment that are responsible for perpetuating certain gender roles;
 Discursive theories, which stress the creation, through language and culture, of meanings that are associated with gender.

They also argue that both the materialist and discursive theories of social construction of gender can be either essentialist or non-essentialist. This means that some of these theories assume a clear biological division between women and men when considering the social creation of masculinity and femininity, while other contest the assumption of the biological division between the sexes as independent of social construction.

Gender

Gender is used as a means of describing the distinction between the biological sex and socialized aspects of femininity and masculinity. According to West and Zimmerman, is not a personal trait; it is "an emergent feature of social situations: both as an outcome of and a rationale for various social arrangements, and as a means of legitimating one of the most fundamental divisions of society."

As a social construct, gender is considered an achieved status by feminist theory, typically (though not exclusively) one which is achieved very early in childhood. The view as achieved is supported by the contemporary constructionist perspective, as proposed by Fenstermaker and West, asserts regarding gender as an activity ("doing") of utilizing normative prescriptions and beliefs about sex categories based on situational variables. These "gender activities" constitute sets of behavior, such as masculine and feminine, which are associated with their sexual counterpart and thus define concepts such as "man" and "woman" respectively. It is noted, however, that the perception as masculine or feminine is not limited or guaranteed to match the expression's typical or intended nature. Hence, gender can be understood as external to the individual, consisting of a series of ongoing judgements and evaluations by others, as well as of others.

Gender roles

Gender roles are a continuation of the gender status, consisting of other achieved statuses that are associated with a particular gender status. In less theoretical terms, gender roles are functional position in a social dynamic for which fulfillment is a part of "doing gender"

Empirical investigations suggest that gender roles are "social constructs that vary significantly across time, context, and culture". Ronald F. Levant and Kathleen Alto write: 

American philosopher Judith Butler makes a distinction between gender performativity and gender roles, which delineates between the social behaviors of the individual seeking to express the behavior which articulate their own perception of their gender; and behavior which creates the perception of compliance with societal gender expressions in aggregate. This is not to imply that participation in gender performativity cannot correspond to pressure to fulfill a gender role, nor that fulfillment of a gender role cannot satisfy the desire for gender performativity. The distinction refers primarily to context and motivation, rather than particular behaviors and consequences- which are often closely linked. Research by Liva and Arqueros describes gendered behaviors being taught. In Argentina, missionaries intending to educate the Qom people reinforced a conversion to gender norms and European modernity on the indigenous community.

In some subdomains of feminism, such as intersectional feminism, gender is a major though not solitary axis along which factors of oppression are considered, as expressed by Berkowitz, who wrote "The gender order is hierarchical in that, overall, men dominate women in terms of power and privilege; yet multiple and conflicting sources of power and oppression are intertwined, and not all men dominate all women. Intersectionality theorizes how gender intersects with race, ethnicity, social class, sexuality, and nation in variegated and situationally contingent ways".

Berkowitz also asserts that gender at large, especially gender roles, contribute greatly as a prolific and potent avenue by which manipulations of social perceptions and expression manifest reality. Specifically, a reality in which women are typically oppressed by men within a social structure that establishes roles for women, which are of explicitly lesser capacity for accruing and exercising arbitrary power. The system which manifest and exercises this power, is typically referred to as "patriarchy". To clarify, the term arbitrary here is used to denote the source of power as being derived from status as feminist theory describes it. The particular model of patriarchy prescribed, does not make any distinction of stratification or power originating from competence or prestige.

Anthropologist Catherine L. Besteman observes the differences in gender roles in the context of parenting by Somali Bantu refugees in Lewiston, Maine; The separate roles communicate the agency of individuals based on their gender – agency in which males tend to be favored in terms of social power. Girls seemed to be "under increasing scrutiny to behave respectably as parents attempted to protect them from America's public sexual culture in the only way they know: early arranged marriage and lots of responsibilities for domestic tasks". Boys, however, were given less responsibilities and more freedom. The distinction between the responsibilities of boys and girls define the refugees' children's understanding of what it means to belong to a particular gender in America with association to "parental authority". Besteman observed the contrast to be a result of a lack traditional male chores in America compared to Somalia, such as farm work, while the traditional female chores were able to be maintained.

Gender identity 

Gender identity is a related concept, which instead of referring to the external social understanding developed between persons, gender identity refers to the internal sense of ones own gender on an individual scale.

Sexuality/sexual orientation
In recent years, elementary schools in the U.S. have started carrying chapter books that include either non-traditional families with same-sex parents, homosexual role models, or (in fewer cases) an adolescent who is discovering and accepting their own sexuality/sexual orientation. Hermann-Wilmarth and Ryan acknowledge this rise in representation, while critiquing the way that the limited selection of books present these characters with an eye towards popularized characterizations of homosexuality. The authors characterize this style of representation as "homonormative", and in the only example of a book where the protagonist questions their gender identity, it is left ambiguous as to whether or not they are a trans man or that they were simply pretending.

Diamond and Butterworth argue that gender identity and sexual identity are fluid and do not always fall into two essentialist categories (man or woman and gay or straight); they came to this conclusion via interviewing women that fall into a sexual minority group over the course of ten years. One woman had a relatively normal early childhood but around adolescence questioned her sexuality and remained stable in her gender and sexual identity until she started working with men and assumed a masculine "stance" and started to question her gender identity. When 'she' became a 'he' he began to find men attractive and gradually identified as a homosexual man.

The perception of sexuality by others is an extension of others' perceptions of one's gender. Heterosexuality is assumed for those individuals who appear to act appropriately masculine or appropriately feminine. If one wants to be perceived as a lesbian, one must first be perceived as a woman; if one wants to be seen as a gay man, one has to be seen as a man.

Core gender identity
According to Alsop, Fitzsimmons & Lennon, "Gender is part of an identity woven from a complex and specific social whole, and requiring very specific and local readings". Thus, gender identity can be defined as part of socially situated understanding of gender. LaFrance, Paluck and Brescoll note that as a term, "gender identity" allows individuals to express their attitude towards and stance in relation to their current status as either women or men. Turning the scope of gender from a social consensus to objectivity to one's self-identification with a certain gender expression leaves much more space for describing variation among individuals.

Intersections of gender identity with other identities

While men and women are held accountable for normative conceptions of gender, this accountability can differ in content based on ethnicity, race, age, class, etc. Hurtado argues that white women and women of color experience gender differently because of their relationship to males of different races and that both groups of women have traditionally been used to substantiate male power in different ways. Some women of color are subordinated through rejection, or denial of the "patriarchal invitation to privilege". For instance, some white men may see women of color as workers and objects of sexual aggression; this would allow the men to display power and sexual aggression without the emotional attachment that they have to white women. White women are accountable for their gendered display as traditionally subservient to white men while women of color may be held accountable for their gendered performance as sexual objects and as recalcitrant and bawdy women in relations with white men. West and Fenstermaker conclude that doing gender involves different versions of accountability, depending on women's "relational position" to white men.

Gender as accomplishment

Gender, according to West and Zimmerman, is not simply what one is, but what one does – it is actively produced within social interactions. Gender is an accomplishment : "the activity of managing situated conduct in light of normative conceptions of attitudes and activities appropriate for one's sex category". People do not have to be in mixed gender groups or in groups at all for the performance of gender to occur; the production of gender occurs with others and is even performed alone, in the imagined presence of others. "Doing" gender is not just about conforming to stereotypical gender roles – it is the active engagement in any behavior that is gendered, or behavior that may be evaluated as gendered.

The performance of gender varies given the context: time, space, social interaction, etc. The enactment of gender roles is context dependent – roles are "situated identities" instead of "master identities". The sociology of knowledge must first of all concern itself with what people "know" as "reality" in their everyday, non- or pre-theoretical lives. In other words, individual perceptions of ""knowledge" or reality...must be the central focus."

These performances normalize the essentialism of sex categories. In other words, by doing gender, we reinforce the essential categories of gender – that there are only two categories that are mutually exclusive. The idea that men and women are essentially different is what makes men and women behave in ways that appear essentially different. Though sex categorization is based on biological sex, it is maintained as a category through socially constructed displays of gender (for example, you could identify a transgender person as female when in fact she is assigned male at birth).

Institutions also create normative conceptions of gender. In other words, gender is simultaneously created and maintained – "both a process and a product, medium and outcome of such power relations". In his examination of blue and white-collar workers, Mumby argued that hegemonic or dominant masculinity provides a standard of acceptable behavior for men, and at the same time, is the product of men's behavior. This can be said for constructions of any identity in certain contexts (e.g. femininity, race, Black femininity, etc.).

Accountability

People hold themselves and each other accountable for their presentations of gender (how they 'measure up'). They are aware that others may evaluate and characterize their behavior. This is an interactional process (not just an individual one). Social constructionism asserts that gender is a category that people evaluate as omnirelevant to social life. Gender as omnirelevant means that people can always be judged by what they do as a man or as a woman. This is the basis for the reasoning that people are always performing gender and that gender is always relevant in social situations.

Accountability can apply to behaviors that do conform to cultural conceptions as well as those behaviors that deviate – it is the possibility of being held accountable that is important in social constructionism. For example, Stobbe examined the rationale that people gave for why there were small numbers of women in the auto industry. Men cited the idea that such dirty work was unsuitable for women and women were unable to train because of family duties. Stobbe argues that the male workers created a machismo masculinity to distinguish themselves from women who might have been qualified to work in the auto shop. Women who do work in male-dominated professions have to carefully maintain and simultaneously balance their femininity and professional credibility.

Even though gender seems more salient in some situations – for instance, when a woman enters a male-dominated profession – gender categories also become salient in contexts in which gender is less obvious. For instance, gender is maintained before the woman enters the male-dominated group through conceptions of masculinity.

Race, class, and other oppressions can also be omnirelevant categories, though they are not all identically salient in every set of social relationships in which inequality is done. People have preconceived notions about what particular racial groups look like (although there is no biological component to this categorization). Accountability is interactional because it does not occur solely within the individual. It is also institutional because individuals may be held accountable for their behaviors by institutions or by others in social situations, as a member of any social group (gender, race, class, etc.). This notion of accountability makes gender dynamic because what is considered appropriate behavior for men and women changes and is reproduced over time and is reproduced differently depending on context. Gender is created in different ways among uneducated and educated African Americans.

Gender in the workplace 
Moroccan women in Belgium with high-skill jobs report struggling to find a work–life balance; they leave ethnicity out of the discussed influences on professional identity, but do discuss gender. Portrayals of gender can be advantageous or disadvantageous for Moroccan women in the Belgian workplace. Disadvantages include the view of women in their twenties as busy with homemaking and child-rearing, and the Islamic tradition of wearing a headscarf leading to discrimination. Advantages include second generation immigrant women receiving less discrimination than men, and being highly educated further reduces chances of discrimination.

In the U.S., changes in gender ideology relate to changes in an individuals life, such as becoming a parent, getting a job, and other milestones. Racial differences and gender are determiners of treatment in the workplace; African American mothers suffer a wage penalty if they are married with big families, while white women are penalized upon becoming a mother. African American husbands are not seen as serious economic providers, and do not receive a wage premium for parenthood, while white fathers do. Current, full-time working women have a more egalitarian gender ideology than non-working or part-time women. Men relate work to providing roles and only shift to a more egalitarian gender ideology when opportunities are blocked and they learn to redefine success; blocked opportunities are more prevalent for black men.

Sex and sex category

West and Zimmerman give this definition for sex in their paper Doing Gender: "Sex is a determination made through the application of socially agreed upon biological criteria for classifying persons as females and males. The criteria for classification can be genitalia at birth or chromosomal typing before birth, and they do not necessarily agree with one another". The differentiation between gender and sex did not arise until the late 1970s, when researchers began using "gender" and "sex" as two separate terms, with "gender" referring to one's self-identity and "sex" referring to one's chromosomal makeup and sex organs. The binary of male and female leaves out everyone who does not fit into these categories because of genital make up, chromosomes, or hormone levels. Anne Fausto-Sterling addresses the issues facing intersex people in her article The Five Sexes. She claims that there is at minimum five sexes but probably more; this is based on the vast range of ways bodies show up in nature. She points out that, "recent advances in physiology and surgical technology now enable physicians to catch most intersexuals at birth... infants are entered into a program of hormonal and surgical management..." This highlights the intense adherence to the binary instead of allowing bodies to present in the world without intervention.

West and Zimmerman also give a definition for sex category: "achieved through application of the sex criteria, but in everyday life, categorization is established and sustained by the socially required identificatory displays that proclaim one's membership in one or the other category". Sex category is applied to a person in everyday life through commonly recognized cues that are not necessarily fulfilling biological criteria of sex. In a different study by Wenzlaff et al., 40 participants in North America were asked whether schematic drawings of nude adults were male or female. The majority response was male for images including a penis, and a more evenly split response for images including a vulva; drawings included both congruent and incongruent genital and secondary sex characteristics, so the presence of a penis is the predominant determiner of perceived gender.

Applications of gender performance

The term gender performativity was first coined by American philosopher and gender theorist Judith Butler in their 1990 book Gender Trouble: Feminism and the Subversion of Identity. In the book, Butler sets out to criticize what they consider to be an outdated perception of gender. This outdated perception, according to Butler, is limiting in that it adheres to the dominant societal constraints that label gender as binary. In scrutinizing gender, Butler introduces a nuanced perception in which they unite the concepts of performativity and gender. In chapter one, Butler introduces the unification of the terms gender and performativity in stating that "gender proves to be performance—that is, constituting the identity it is purported to be. In this sense, gender is always a doing, though not a doing by a subject who might be said to pre-exist the deed".

In demystifying this concept, Butler sets out to clarify that there is indeed a difference in the terms gender performance and gender performativity. In a 2011 interview, Butler stated it this way:

Thus, Butler perceives gender as being constructed through a set of acts that are said to be in compliance with dominant societal norms. Butler is, however, not stating that gender is a sort of performance in which an individual can terminate the act; instead, what Butler is stating is that this performance is ongoing and out of an individual's control. In fact, rather than an individual producing the performance, the opposite is true. The performance is what produces the individual. Specifically, Butler approvingly quotes Nietzsche's claim that "there is no 'being' behind doing... 'the doer' is merely a fiction added to the deed – the deed is everything." Thus, the emphasis is placed not on the individual producing the deed but on the deed itself.

On Butler's hypothesis, the socially constructed aspect of gender performativity is perhaps most obvious in drag performance, which offers a rudimentary understanding of gender binaries in its emphasis on gender performance. Butler understands drag cannot be regarded as an example of subjective or singular identity, where "there is a 'one' who is prior to gender, a one who goes to the wardrobe of gender decides with deliberation which gender it will be today". Consequently, drag should not be considered the honest expression of its performer's intent. Rather, Butler suggests that what is performed "can only be understood through reference to what is barred from the signifier within the domain of corporeal legibility".

Amelia Jones proposes that this mode of viewing gender offered a way to move beyond the theories of the gaze and sexual fetishism, which had attained much prominence in academic feminism, but which by the 1980s Jones viewed as outdated methods of understanding women's societal status. Jones believes the performative power to act out gender is extremely useful as a framework, offering new ways to consider images as enactments with embodied subjects rather than inanimate objects for men's viewing pleasure.

Infancy and young childhood

The idea around gender performativity, when applied to infancy and young childhood, deals with the idea that from the moment one is conceived, arguably even before that, who they are and who they will become is predetermined. Children learn at a very young age what it means to be a boy or girl in our society. Individuals are either given masculine or feminine names based on their sex, are assigned colors that are deemed appropriate only when utilized by a particular sex and are even given toys that will aid them in recognizing their proper places in society. According to Barbara Kerr and Karen Multon, many parents would be puzzled to know "the tendency of little children to think that it is their clothing or toys that make them boy or girl". Parents are going as far as coordinating their daughter with the color pink because it's feminine, or blue for their son because it's masculine. In discussing these points, Penelope Eckert, in her text titled Language and Gender, states: "the first thing people want to know about a baby is its sex, and social convention provides a myriad of props to reduce the necessity of asking". Thus, this reinforces the importance and emphasis that society places not only on sex but also on ways in which to point towards one's sex without implicitly doing so. Eckert furthers this in stating that determining sex at one's birth is also vital of how one presents themselves in society at an older age because "sex determination sets the stage for a lifelong process of gendering". Eckert's statement points to Judith Butler's view of gender as being performative. Similar to Butler, Eckert is hinting to the fact that gender is not an internal reality that cannot be changed. What Eckert is instead stating is that this is a common misconception that a majority of the population unknowingly reinforces, which sees its emergence during infancy.

Butler suggests in both "Critically Queer" and "Melancholy Gender" that the child/subject's ability to grieve the loss of the same-sex parent as a viable love object is barred. Following from Sigmund Freud's notion of melancholia, such a repudiation results in a heightened identification with the Other that cannot be loved, resulting in gender performances which create allegories of, and internalize the lost love that the subject is subsequently unable to acknowledge or grieve. Butler explains that "a masculine gender is formed from the refusal to grieve the masculine as a possibility of love; a feminine gender is formed (taken on, assumed) through the fantasy which the feminine is excluded as a possible object of love, an exclusion never grieved, but 'preserved' through the heightening of feminine identification itself".

Teen years

One's teen years are the prime time in which socialization occurs as well as the time in which how one presents themselves in society is of high concern. Often, this is the time in which one's ability to master their gender performance labels them as successful, and thus normal, or unsuccessful, and thus strange and unfitting. One of the sources that demonstrate how successful performance is acted out is magazines, specifically magazines targeting young girls. According to Eckert, "When we are teenagers, the teen magazines told girls how to make conversation with boys...". This not only emphasizes the fact that gender is something that is taught to us and is continuously being shaped by society's expectations, but it also points to one of the ways in which individuals are being subconsciously trained to be ideal participants in the gender binary. Thus calling back to Butler's perception that gender is not a fact about us but is something that is taught to us and is being constantly reinforced. This idea that gender is constantly shaped by expectations is relevant in the online community. Teenagers are easily able to formulate relationships and friendships online, thus increasing the probability of a teenager's delicate identity to be manipulated and distorted. Teenagers often come across situations in real life and online that cause them to question themselves when facing society, including gender performance.

Queer identity 
The Butlerian model presents a queer perspective on gender performance and explores the possible intersection between socially constructed gender roles and compulsory heterosexuality. This model diverges from the hegemonic analytical framework of gender that many claim is heteronormative, contending with the ways in which queer actors problematize the traditional construction of gender. Butler adapts the psychoanalytical term of melancholia to conceptualize homoerotic subtext as it exists in western literature and especially the relationship between women writers, their gender, and their sexuality. Melancholia deals with mourning, but for homosexual couples it is not just mourning the death of the relationship, instead it is the societal disavowal of the relationship itself and the ability to mourn, thus leading to repression of these feelings. This idea is reflected in the activism organized by political groups such as ACT UP during the AIDS crisis. Many of the survivors that participated in this activism were homosexuals who had lost their partners to the disease. The survivors commemorated the dead by quilting together their rags, repurposing their possessions, and displaying their own bodies for premature mourning. All of these protests amounted to a message that some part of them will be left in the world after they have expired.

Queer Failure is a concept in queer theory that also calls gender into question, because it examines queer art and the bodies of LGBTQ+ people through the lens of what a parental figure may identify as "failure" on the part of their character. Instead of recognizing these instances as moral or psychological failures, this concept frames them as the resultants of a conflict between a person's sexuality and their gender.

Political potential and limits 
Butler suggests that "[t]he critical promise of drag does not have to do with the proliferation of genders... but rather with the exposure of the failure of heterosexual regimes ever fully to legislate or contain their own ideals", although such remarks fail to indicate how the inadequacies of heterosexual regimes might be explicitly exposed. 

According to Butler, gender performance is only subversive because it is "the kind of effect that resists calculation", which is to say that signification is multiplicitous, that the subject is unable to control it, and so subversion is always occurring and always unpredictable. Moya Lloyd suggests that the political potential of gender performances can be evaluated relative to similar past acts in similar contexts in order to assess their transgressive potential: "Even if we accept that there are incalculable effects to all (or most) statements or activities, this does not mean that we need to concede that there are no calculable effects." Conversely, Rosalyn Diprose lends a hard-line Foucauldian interpretation to her understanding of gender performance's political reach, as one's identity "is built on the invasion of the self by the gestures of others, who, by referring to other others, are already social beings".  Diprose implies that the individual's will, and the individual performance, is always subject to the dominant discourse of an Other (or Others), so as to restrict the transgressive potential of performance to the inscription of simply another dominant discourse.

Martha Nussbaum criticizes Butler's concepts of gender performativity as a misguided retreat from engaging with real-world concerns:

Butler suggests to her readers that this sly send-up of the status quo is the only script for resistance that life offers [...] Butlerian feminism is in many ways easier than the old feminism. It tells scores of talented young women that they need not work on changing the law, or feeding the hungry, or assailing power through theory harnessed to material politics. They can do politics in safety of their campuses, remaining on the symbolic level, making subversive gestures at power through speech and gesture. This, the theory says, is pretty much all that is available to us anyway, by way of political action, and isn't it exciting and sexy?

During development
Gender features strongly in most societies and is a significant aspect of self-definition for most people. One way to analyze the social influences that affect the development of gender is through the perspective of the social cognitive theory. According to Kay Bussey, social cognitive theory describes "how gender conceptions are developed and transformed across the life span". The social cognitive theory views gender roles as socially constructed ideas that are obtained over one's entire lifetime. These gender roles are "repeatedly reinforced through socialization". Hackman verifies that these gender roles are instilled in us from "the moment we are born". For the individual, gender construction starts with assignments to a sex category on the basis of biological genitalia at birth. Following this sexual assignment, parents begin to influence gender identity by dressing children in ways that clearly display this biological category. Therefore, biological sex becomes associated with a gender through naming, dress, and the use of other gender markers. Gender development continues to be affected by the outlooks of others, education institutions, parenting, media, etc. These variations of social interactions force individuals to "learn what is expected, see what is expected, act and react in expected ways, and thus simultaneously construct and maintain the gender order".

Gender-based harassment
It is very common for gender-based harassment to occur throughout the academic years of a person's life. This serves as a form of gender boundary policing. People who identify as women are expected to conform to stereotypical gendered appearances, as are people who identify as male. Students regularly take part in policing gender boundaries through bullying. Male students frequently harass male and female students, while female students generally only harass other female students. The practice of male students bullying other male students is explicitly linked to machismo, which is the notion that boys are expected to subscribe to in order to be constructed and related to as 'normal' boys. Many girls report that boys tease and ridicule them on the basis of their appearance, which is linked to boys asserting masculine power through sexist practices of denigrating girls. This also serves to perpetuate the idea that appearance is a female's most important asset. In their study, "Correlates and Consequences of Peer Victimization: Gender Differences in Direct and Indirect Forms of Bullying", Lopez, Esbensen & Brick state that "boys were more likely to experience direct or physical forms of bullying and girls were more likely to report being teased or joked about." This can be interpreted as females typically harassing other females in more of a mental, emotional, and psychological torment while males take more of a physical and aggressive approach. Unique appearances and attempts to stand out among girls are regarded very negatively. This type of female on female bullying sets the standard for norms on appearance and the importance of conforming to the societal expectations of that appearance for females. Overall, gender-based harassment serves to define and enforce gender boundaries of students by students.

Adolescent view of adulthood

Gender is a cultural construction which creates an environment where an adolescent's performance in high school is related to their life goals and expectations. Because some young women believe that they want to be mothers and wives, the choice of professions and future goals can be inherently flawed by the gender constraints. Because a girl may want to be a mother later, her academics in high school can create clear gender differences because "higher occupational expectations, educational expectations, and academic grades were more strongly associated with the expected age of parenthood for girls than for boys". With "young women recognizing potential conflicts between the demands of work and family", they will not try as hard in high school allowing males to achieve higher academic achievement then girls. Crocket and Beal in their article "The Life Course in the Making: Gender and the Development of Adolescents", "gender differences in the anticipated timing of future role transitions, the impact of expectations and values on these expected timings, and the extent to which expectations foreshadow actual behavior". The actions of a youth in high school greatly impact the choices the individual will have over a lifetime. Women especially are constrained in the way they view their adulthood even at a young age because of motherhood.

Males can also be subject to gender construction due to social expectations of masculinity. According to Jack Halberstam (under the name Judith), people correlate masculinity with "maleness and to power to domination", something that he believes is a result of patriarchy. In a 2015 study published in the American Journal of Public Health, researchers stated that gender construct can differ depending on the man's race or ethnicity and stated that for white men there was an emphasis on "education, employment, and socioeconomic status" whereas the expectations for black men focused on "sexual prowess, physical dominance, and gamesmanship". These expectations can make it harder for males to display emotions without receiving criticism and being seen as less of a man.

Adolescents view on adulthood is also determined by their employment in high school. Many boys work during high school and "unlike young women, young men who had not worked during high school did not quite match their peers". Because many other boys are working, those who do not work may not be as successful after graduation. In the book Working and Growing Up in America, Jeylan T. Mortimer explains "youth who work during high school, and those who devote more hours to work, are more vocationally successful after leaving high school". This creates a distinct gender difference in which men are more likely to be employed after high school than women if they have worked during high school. This means women may be at an academic advantage if they do not work in high school and focus on school work.

Depression

High school continues to become a more high-pressure environment with academic and social triggers increasing the expectations of adolescents. High school is a large transitional period for teenagers causing them to "cope with these various transitions in different ways; some negotiate the passages easily whereas others develop serious behavioral and psychological problems". One of these psychological problems is depression. While the environment of high school can be stressful biological functions also play a large role is psychological well-being. Negriff and Susman explain in their article "Pubertal Timing, Depression, and Externalizing Problems" that "the same hormones that increase during puberty are also related to depression and aggressive tendencies. Higher levels of testosterone are associated with increased aggression in boys and girls, whereas higher estrogen for girls is associated with increased depressive symptoms". The gender differences observed may not just be due to the cultural expectations, but rather a biological function of the sex the individuals are born with. Self-esteem has also been linked to depression in high school students. One study done by James Battle in 1980 took 26 student ages 15–18 showed a correlation between depression and self-esteem.  In the 80s, research had not looked past adults and Battle's research was some of the first of its kind which showed a direct correlation between self-esteem and depression. Self-esteem is not a product of our biology but rather is culturally constructed. Girls in high school also tend to have lower self-esteem due to body image. With depression and self-esteem being so closely linked the potential for having the disease can result in an educational experience which can be compromised. Depression can be isolating, and without proper academics and societal support, high school can be challenging. Along with higher rates of self-esteem issues in adolescents, this can adversely affect girls' academics and social life in high school.

Body image

There are many different factors that affect body image, "including sex, media, parental relationship, and puberty as well as weight and popularity". The intersectionality of these factors causes individualistic experiences for adolescents during this period within their lives. As their body changes, so does the environment in which they live in. Body image is closely linked to psychological well-being during adolescence and can cause harmful effects when a child has body dissatisfaction. In the article "Body Image and Psychological Well-Being in Adolescents: The Relationship between Gender and School Type", Helen Winfield explains that an adolescent's high school experience is closely linked to their perceived body image. She analyzed over 336 teenagers and found "ratings of physical attractiveness and body image remain relatively stable across the early teenage years, but become increasingly negative around age 15–18 years because of pubertal changes". This shift during the high school years may cause serious psychological problems for adolescents. These psychological problems can manifest into eating disorders causing serious lifelong problems. Due to these findings, it is shown that these body image issues are especially prevalent in girls but as boys enter puberty, expectations of height and muscle mass change as well. Geoffrey H. Cohane, Harrison G. Pope Jr. in their article, "Body image in boys: A review of the literature", claim that "girls typically wanted to be thinner, boys frequently wanted to be bigger". This statistic displays that gender difference in body image cause different beauty ideals. Gender can have an impact of affecting an adolescent's body image and potentially their high school experience.

Education

Due to the amount of time that children spend in school, "teachers are influential role models for many aspects of children's educational experiences, including gender socialization".  Teachers who endorse the culturally dominant gender-role stereotype regarding the distribution of talent between males and females distort their perception of their students' mathematical abilities and effort resources in mathematics, in a manner that is consistent with their gender-role stereotype and to a greater extent than teachers who do not endorse the stereotype.

According to the 1994 report Intelligence: Knowns and Unknowns by the American Psychological Association, "[m]ost standard tests of intelligence have been constructed so that there are no overall score differences between females and males." Differences have been found, however, in specific areas such as mathematics and verbal measures. Even within mathematics, it is noted that significant differences in performance as a result of gender do not occur until late in high school, a result of biological differences, the exhibition of stereotypes by teachers, and the difference in chosen coursework between individual students. While, on average, boys and girls perform similarly in math, boys are over represented among the very best performers as well as the very worst. Teachers have found that when certain types of teaching (such as experiments that reflect daily life), work for girls, they generally work for boys as well.

Although little difference in mathematics performance was found among younger students, a study of students grade 1-3 by Fennema et al. noted that significant differences in problem-solving strategies were found, with girls tending to use more standard algorithms than the boys. They suggest that this may be due to both the teachers' stereotypical beliefs about mathematics and gender, as well as the study's design permitting "the children's stereotypical beliefs to influence strategy use and thus the development of understanding in these classrooms". A study conducted at Illinois State University examined the effects of gender stereotypes on the teaching practices of three third grade teachers, noting that "[the teachers] claimed gender neutrality, yet they expressed numerous beliefs about gender difference during the study", such as allowing boys (but not girls) to respond to questions without raising their hand or providing reading selections that promoted women in non-traditional roles, but not doing the same for men.

Overall, differences in student performance that arise from gender tend to be smaller than that of other demographic differences, such as race or socioeconomic class. The results of the 1992 NAEP 12th grade science tests, on a 500-point scale, show that the differences of scores between white and African American students were around 48 points, while differences between male and female students were around 11 points.

Media 
Social gender construction (specifically for younger audiences) is also influenced by media. In the 21st century, modern technology is abundant in developed countries. In 2018, roughly 42% of tweens and teens experience feelings of anxiety when not near their phones. There is a growing amount of teens that spend an average of 6.5 hours on media daily. This data reflects how much of a teenager's personality is dependent on media. Media influencing gender construction can be seen in advertising, social networking, magazines, television, music, and music videos.

These platforms can affect how a developing human views themselves and those around them. There is both positive and negative media and each type can be perceived differently. Media will often portray men and women in a stereotypical manner, reflecting their "ideal image" for society. These images often act as an extreme expectation for many developing teenagers.

Men are typically portrayed as assertive, powerful, and strong. Particularly in television, men are usually shown as being nonemotional and detached. Women are often portrayed as the opposite. Gender roles are generally more enforced for women in media than they are for men. Women are typically represented as the backbone of the household, the caretaker, and as stay at home mothers. Women in media are often given weak, dependent, and passive personalities. Media presence often perpetuates that men are not allowed to be caring and that women are not allowed to be strong and demanding. These gender influences from the media can mislead a growing child or teenager because while they are still trying to construct their identities and genders in a social environment, they are surrounded by biased influences.

The Internet reflects the values of offline society, and the jokes made online reveal the values and opinions reflected in those jokes, despite them being couched in humor. Memes are used to make sexist ideas into 'jokes', reinforcing sexist gender stereotypes, making threats against women, and mocking transgender people. Many of these views, when questioned or concerns are raised about them, are hidden, saying it was just a joke or a meme. However, memes and internet communities are also very common in feminist and transgender spaces, where jokes about gender are kinder and come from within the community rather than outside of it.

Research methods

Inclusiveness and acceptance play significant roles in social constructionist practice – examples include sharing work with others in a cooperative manner, including a diverse sample, being open to other interpretations of data, and blurring the lines between scientific research, participatory research and social activism. The blurring of scientific research also means incorporating other disciplines into psychological work (e.g. performative psychology includes artistic expression or humor) and thinking in terms that go beyond traditional scientific language. These methods are not currently valued in psychology because they are not seen as scientific.

A social constructionist psychologist can make it explicit that his or her perspective is not universally true in all contexts across historical periods. Social constructionists recognize that every researcher has an opinion and is biased in some way. They acknowledge that their own views and findings/results of a study are open to deconstructive critique – no grand truth can be found because everything is context-specific and has potential to change across time periods and different situations. Related to this is the idea that social constructionists must constantly question their own work because their work can be constantly reinterpreted and have different meanings at different times.

Social constructionists argue that the gender dichotomy is so ingrained that it is impossible for research findings to remain unaffected by it. People are often convinced that there are inherent differences between men and women, which skews both studies and their findings. That is, research questions are framed in ways that look for a difference between genders, and thus their methods will be constrained by this framework as well. Moreover, the actual outcome of the study, even if the claims are dubious or modest at best, often come to be accepted as facts if they support the gender discourse narrative and are often cited and discussed. This phenomenon is labeled the "hall of mirrors" effect.

In order to fully and accurately record the socialization processes at play regarding gender construction, ethnographic and longitudinal studies are ideal. However, these methods have their constraints. It is costly and time-consuming to carry out such studies that would yield significant results, and there is an abundance of factors that influence an individual's gender construction. Thus, more research is needed regarding the social construction of gender.

Research can either be qualitative or quantitative. Qualitative data is beneficial because it can give a voice to the subjects of the study. However, poorly-constructed qualitative research can lead to reproduction of race and class biases if findings are inappropriately generalized. For example, qualitative research methods often involve small, homogeneous samples. Therefore, it would be inappropriate to generalize the findings of a study conducted on a specific group of people and then apply them to all people of that gender.

Quantitative data is useful when hard data is needed, such as addressing policy issues, when hard data is needed to convince people unfamiliar with the topics. However, quantitative research can reinforce gender and cultural assumptions as well through item construction. That is, for data to be quantitatively analysed, they must fit into specific categories. However, such categories can be based on or at least influenced by gender stereotypes.

Promoting social change and criticisms

Social change

Gender often means adhering to gender normative behavior and roles. The performance of gender reinforces the essentialism of gender categories. Essentialism argues that there are essential differences between genders which manifest themselves in differences in gender performance. Gender performance consists of a stylized practice involving gestures, language, and speech and serves to form and build an identity. When an individual performs their gender to the standards set by societal norms, this bolsters the argument of gender essentialism.  Historically, men have assumed a dominant gender role, and women have been prescribed a role submissive to men. In order for subordination to go unquestioned, the structure must not appear as a cultural product – it must seem natural. Social movements can challenge the categories that appear "natural". Certain legislation can promote equality for men and women, which could call into question whether there needs to be two categories of gender at all (if both are treated equally). Social change relies on an understanding of how inequality is rooted in gender accomplishment.

Throughout history, women have fought for their rights regarding various issues.. The first wave, which began in 1854, was a fight for women's rights to education and to the vote by the suffragettes. This movement was then followed by Second-wave feminism and Third-wave feminism which furthered the feminist cause. The feminist movement was not only about fighting for women's rights, but more essentially about earning recognition and respect from the general public acknowledging the fact that they are not inferior than men and thus deserving to be treated equally and granted fair opportunities. Feminism emerged and started to challenge the idea that a woman's appropriate place was confined to that of the domestic and private sphere. Over time, men and women's attitudes have been becoming more liberalized with regard to gender roles. Men and women are agreeing on a more egalitarian responsibility distribution within the family sphere. They are also in agreement that women should and can have roles in the public sphere, especially in leadership positions and that men can have an involved role in the private and domestic sphere. These markers of increasingly liberalized attitudes toward gender roles indicate the trajectory of social change in terms of what is deemed normative.

Criticism and opportunities to "undo" gender

Because the theory says that one can "do" gender whether they conform to gender norms or not (and is always held accountable for behaving in accordance with gender norms), change seems impossible. If essential differences between the sexes are problematic, a society where gender is omnirelevant could be argued to always uphold gender inequality. The language of "doing" gender implies doing difference instead of unraveling it. Most studies that rely on social constructionism explore the ways in which gender is constructed but nevertheless demonstrate how those gender constructions uphold gender as a construct and gender inequality.

However, because gender is "done" or constructed, it can also be "undone" or deconstructed. The study of the interactional level could expand beyond simply documenting the persistence of inequality to examine: (1) when and how social interactions become less gendered, not just differently gendered, (2) the conditions under which gender is irrelevant in social interactions, (3) whether all gendered interactions reinforce inequality, (4) how the structural (institutional) and interactional levels might work together to produce change, and (5) interaction as the site of change.

Nature versus nurture

Theories that imply that gendered behavior is totally or mostly due to social conventions and culture represent an extreme nurture position in the nature versus nurture debate.

See also

 Detransition
 Gender studies
 Heterosexism
 Homophobia
 Postgenderism
 Sexism
 Transphobia

References

Further reading

Gender roles
Gender
Feminist theory